Grinnell is a surname, originally of locational or topographical origin.

Notable people with the surname include:

Claudia Kreuzig Grinnell, German expatriate, English professor and poet
Frederick Grinnell (1836–1905), American engineer
Frederick Grinnell (biologist) (born 1945), American biologist
George Bird Grinnell, (1849–1938), American anthropologist, historian, naturalist, and writer
George Blake Grinnell (1823–1891), American merchant and financier
Henry Grinnell  (1799–1874), American merchant, financier of Arctic explorations
Henry Walton Grinnell (1843–1920), American admiral, son of Henry Grinnell
Joseph Grinnell (1877–1939), American zoologist
Josiah Bushnell Grinnell (1821–1891), U.S. congressman
Katherine Van Allen Grinnell (1839-1917), American lecturer, author, reformer
Moses H. Grinnell (1803–1877), U.S. Navy officer and U.S. Representative from New York
William Morton Grinnell (1857–1906), U.S. diplomat & banker
Elizabeth Grinnell (1851–1935), American writer, clubwoman, and naturalist

References